Follow Blind is the fifth studio album by punk rock band Wipers, released in 1987 by Restless Records. It was recorded at 421 Sound in Portland, Oregon.

Track listing 
All songs written by Greg Sage.
 "Follow Blind" – 3:37
 "Someplace Else" – 2:51
 "Any Time You Find" – 4:28
 "The Chill Remains" – 3:30
 "Let It Slide" – 2:32
 "Against the Wall" – 3:07
 "No Doubt About It" – 2:31
 "Don't Belong To You" – 2:26
 "Losers Town" – 3:00
 "Coming Down" – 2:12
 "Next Time" – 3:14

Personnel 
 Greg Sage – vocals, guitar, harp; producer. Recorded by Greg Sage.
 Brad Davidson – bass guitar
 Steve Plouf – drums
 David Wilds – Photography

References

1986 albums
Wipers albums
Restless Records albums